Aw Aaakare Aa is a 2003 Indian Oriya film directed by Subash Das. This film reflects change in the present education system and projected another very sensitive issue — the drudgery and defeatism of modern education system.

Synopsis 
This is the story of a school teacher, Mini. Her efforts to change the conventional pattern of education creates hurdles in her own career. Without being able to compromise, she is frequently transferred from one school to another. Her only solace is her childhood memory which surfaces time and again. Finally Mini does not reconcile with the present educational system, resigns and starts her own school where there are no four-walls and no regimentation.

Cast
Adyasha Mohapatra as Mini (Childhood)
Dipti Panda as Mini (Adulthood)

Music 
Bidyadhar Sahu has arranged music for this film.

Awards & Participation
National Film Awards, India(2004) -Best Odia film
Orissa State Film Awards, (2003) - Best film, Best Direction, Best Child actress and best editing
13th Golden Elephant International Children's Film Festival
International Film Festival at Jamshedpur (Children’s section).

References

External links
Prveiw of 'Aw Aaakare Aa' in hollywood.premiere.com
Review of 'Aw Aaakare Aa ' in www.magiclanternfoundation.org
Review of 'Aw Aaakare Aa' in cinema.theiapolis.com
 

2003 films
2000s Odia-language films